Amos Adani (born 2 April 1946) is an Italian retired footballer. He spent most of his career in Bologna in the Serie A.

Honours
Coppa Italia
Bologna: 1969–70, 1973–74

References

1946 births
Living people
Sportspeople from Modena
Italian footballers
Association football goalkeepers
Serie A players
Serie B players
Modena F.C. players
Bologna F.C. 1909 players
Footballers from Emilia-Romagna